The Algerian Chess Championship is currently organized by FADE, the Algerian Chess Federation, which was established in 1973. It joined FIDE in 1974 and held the first national championships in 1975.

National championship winners

{| class="sortable wikitable"
! Year !! Champion
|-
| 1975 || Chaabi
|-
| 1976 ||Boulsane
|-
| 1977 ||Abdelatif Henni
|-
| 1978 || Abdelatif Kharchi
|-
| 1979 ||Abdelatif Kharchi
|-
| 1980 || Zitouni Cherrad
|-
| 1981 || Aziz Madani Benhadi
|-
| 1982 || Abdelhamid Slimani
|-
| 1983 || Abderahmane Bousmaha
|-
| 1985 ||Abderahmane Bousmaha
|-
| 1986 || Kamel Sebih
|-
| 1988 || Mahfoud Boudiba
|-
| 1989 ||Kamel Sebih
|-
| 1990 ||Kamel Sebih
|-
| 1991 || Abd'Ennacer Bammoune
|-
| 1992 || Abdelnour Ahmed Zaid
|- 
| 1993 ||Kamel Sebih
|-
| 1994 || 
|- 
| 1995 || Mohamed Henni
|-
| 1996 ||Mohamed Henni
|-
| 1997 ||Mohamed Henni
|- 
| 1998 ||Mohamed Henni
|-
| 1999 || Aimen Rizouk
|-
| 2000 ||Mohamed Henni
|-
| 2001 || Saad Belouadah
|-
| 2002 ||Saad Belouadah
|-
| 2003 ||Mohamed Henni
|-
| 2004 ||Saad Belouadah
|-
| 2005 || Mohamed Haddouche
|-
| 2006 || Badr-Eddine Khelfallah
|-
| 2007 ||Saad Belouadah
|-
| 2008 || Tarek Goutali
|-
| 2009 ||Mohamed Haddouche
|-
| 2010 ||Saad Belouadah
|-
| 2011 ||Mohamed Haddouche
|-
| 2012 ||Mohamed Haddouche
|-
| 2013 ||Mohamed Haddouche
|-
| 2014 ||Mohamed Haddouche
|-
| 2015 ||Mohamed Haddouche
|-
| 2016 || Chafik Talbi
|-
| 2017 ||Mohamed Haddouche
|-
| 2018 || Bilel Bellahcene
|-
| 2019 ||Chafik Talbi
|}

References

Chess national championships
Chess in Algeria
Recurring sporting events established in 1975
1975 in chess
1975 establishments in Algeria
Sports competitions in Algeria
Annual events in Algeria
Chess